Tuomas Rantanen (born 1 January 1972) from Tampere, Finland is a musician creating hard, monotonous and percussive techno music. Outside music, Tuomas Rantanen is specialized in the philosophy of Martin Heidegger.

12" discography
 Access Denied EP  (Template Records)
 Kaotic EP  (KK Traxx)
 Scapes  (Definition Records)
 Alliance 1  (Audio Assault)
 Emergence Six (Emergence Records)
 Rocket Bay (Fak Records)
 Shamanalogue (KK Traxx)
 Disyllabic (Maracas Records)

Compilation appearances discography
 Imaginary Fields Pt. 1 - Collection Of Short-Circuited Traxx (Oikosulku Records)
 Solid Players (12") (Definition Records)
 Solid Players Part II (12") (Definition Records)
 CTNERMX (by Club Telex Noise Ensemble vs various artists) (pHinnMilk Recordings)
 Components III EP (12") (Electracom Records)
 Remix Poison (12") (Definition Records)
 Element EP Part 2 (12") (Unknown Forces Records)
 Submissions 9 (12") (Submissions Records)

Official link
Tuomas Rantanen

Unofficial links
Tuomas Rantanen @ Discogs.Com

1972 births
Living people
Finnish male musicians
Techno musicians
musicians from Tampere